Zoe Laskari (12 December 1942 – 18 August 2017) was a Greek film and stage actress.

Life
Zoe Laskari was born Zoe Kouroukli in Thessaloniki, Greece, on 12 December 1942—not 1943 or 1944, as had been misreported during her lifetime and after her death—into a middle class family which had a long tradition of service to the Hellenic Army. father was murdered during the German occupation in late 1943.

She was raised by her maternal grandparents. In 1959, she won the title of Star Hellas (Miss Greece) - in order to participate in the pageant she added two years to her age to be of age and went on to represent Greece at the Miss Universe pageant in Long Beach, California where she made it to the semifinals. However, while being in the United States, it was revealed that she was still legally a minor, having obscured her true age. She refused to return to Greece and stayed in New York City for about 18 months.

Marriages
In 1967, she married industrialist Petros Koutoumanos, by whom she had her first daughter, Martha Koutoumanou. Their marriage ended in 1971. In June 1976, she married criminologist Alexandros Lykourezos, by whom she had a second daughter, Maria-Eleni Lykourezou.

Career
Due to her success at the beauty pageant, director Giannis Dalianidis, offered her the starring role in O katiforos, a 1961 film, whose success gave her a rapid popularity and she shortly signed an exclusive contract with the biggest Greek film production company at the time, Finos Film. The films in which she appeared ranged from dramas to comedies and musicals. Some of her later movies were Stefania (1966) and Oi Thalassies oi Hadres (1967). Other Laskari film hits were Nomos 4000, Merikoi to protimoun kryo, Koritsia gia filima, Dakrya gia tin Ilektra, Mia kyria sta bouzoukia and Marihouana stop.

Her stage work included famous plays like Edward Albee's Who's Afraid of Virginia Woolf?, the ancient Greek tragedy The Trojan Women by Euripides and Neil Simon's Barefoot in the Park. Her theatrical hits include the play Oi erastes tou Oneirou which was also her first play in Athens. Laskari's first television appearance was her leading role in the TV series Romaios kai Ioulieta in 1976.

Death
Laskari died on 18 August 2017 at Porto Rafti, from heart failure. She had two daughters, Martha Koutoumanou and Maria-Eleni Lykourezou.

Filmography

References

External links
Official website 

1942 births
2017 deaths
Age controversies
20th-century Greek actresses
21st-century Greek actresses
Greek beauty pageant winners
Greek female models
Greek film actresses
Greek Macedonians
Greek stage actresses
Miss Universe 1959 contestants
Actors from Thessaloniki
Models from Thessaloniki